In fluid dynamics, the enstrophy  can be interpreted as another type of potential density; or, more concretely, the quantity directly related to the kinetic energy in the flow model that corresponds to dissipation effects in the fluid. It is particularly useful in the study of turbulent flows, and is often identified in the study of thrusters as well as the field of combustion theory.

Given a domain  and a once-weakly differentiable vector field  which represents a fluid flow, such as a solution to the Navier-Stokes equations, its enstrophy is given by:

where . This quantity is the same as the squared seminorm of the solution in the Sobolev space . 

In the case that the flow is incompressible, or equivalently that , the enstrophy can be described as the integral of the square of the vorticity ,

or, in terms of the flow velocity,

In the context of the incompressible Navier-Stokes equations, enstrophy appears in the following useful result

The quantity in parentheses on the left is the energy in the flow, so the result says that energy declines proportional to the kinematic viscosity  times the enstrophy.

External links 
 
 

Continuum mechanics
Fluid dynamics

References